The Netherlands is scheduled to participate in the Eurovision Song Contest 2023 in Liverpool, United Kingdom, having internally selected Mia Nicolai and Dion Cooper to represent the country with the song "Burning Daylight".

Background 

In , the nation qualified for the final and finished 11th with "" by S10.

The Dutch national broadcaster, AVROTROS, broadcasts the event within the Netherlands and organises the selection process for the nation's entry. However, internal selections have also been held on numerous occasions. Since , the broadcaster has internally selected the Dutch entry for the contest. In 2013, the internal selection of Anouk performing "Birds" managed to take the country to the final for the first time in eight years and placed ninth overall. In , the internal selection of the Common Linnets performing "Calm After the Storm" qualified the nation to the final once again and placed second, while the internal selection of Duncan Laurence in 2019 managed to achieve a Dutch victory for the first time since 1975. For 2023, the broadcaster opted to continue selecting the Dutch entry through an internal selection.

Before Eurovision

Internal selection 
A submission period was opened by the broadcaster on 17 May 2022 where artists and composers were able to submit their entries until 31 August 2022. Each artist and songwriter was able to submit a maximum of three songs, which were judged by a selection commission consisting of AVROTROS general director Eric van Stade, television presenter and author Cornald Maas, singer and television presenter Jan Smit, radio DJs Hila Noorzai, Carolien Borgers and Sander Lantinga.

AVROTROS announced Mia Nicolai and Dion Cooper as the Dutch entrants on 1 November 2022. Nicolai and Cooper's entry were selected from four entries shortlisted among nearly 400 submissions received by the broadcaster, one of which was performed by Dani van Velthoven, winner of the eleventh season of the reality singing competition The Voice of Holland. Some controversy emerged after the selection, as it was alleged that Nicolai had already been informed she would represent the country right after the opening of the submission period, which AVROTROS claimed to be false.

Nicolai and Cooper's song for the contest, "Burning Daylight", was revealed on 1 March 2023, during the talk show Khalid en Sophie on NPO 1. The song was co-written by Duncan Laurence (winner of the Eurovision Song Contest 2019), Jordan Garfield and Loek van der Grinten.

At Eurovision 
According to Eurovision rules, all nations with the exceptions of the host country and the "Big Five" (France, Germany, Italy, Spain and the United Kingdom) are required to qualify from one of two semi-finals in order to compete for the final; the top ten countries from each semi-final progress to the final. The European Broadcasting Union (EBU) split up the competing countries into six different pots based on voting patterns from previous contests, with countries with favourable voting histories put into the same pot. On 31 January 2023, an allocation draw was held, which placed each country into one of the two semi-finals, and determined which half of the show they would perform in. The Netherlands has been placed into the first semi-final, to be held on 9 May 2023, and has been scheduled to perform in the second half of the show.

References 

Netherlands in the Eurovision Song Contest
Countries in the Eurovision Song Contest 2023
Eurovision Song Contest